Maurice Gustave Gamelin (20 September 1872 – 18 April 1958) was an army general in the French Army. Gamelin is remembered for his disastrous command (until 17 May 1940) of the French military during the Battle of France (10 May–22 June 1940) in World War II and his steadfast defence of republican values.

The Commander-in-chief of the French Armed Forces at the start of World War II, Gamelin was viewed as a man with significant intellectual ability. He was respected, even in Germany, for his intelligence and "subtle mind", though he was viewed by some German generals as stiff and predictable. Despite this, and his competent service in World War I, his command of the French armies during the critical days of May 1940 proved to be disastrous. Historian and journalist William L. Shirer presented the view that Gamelin used World War I methods to fight World War II, but with less vigor and slower response.

Gamelin served with distinction under Joseph Joffre in World War I. He is often credited with being responsible for devising the outline of the French counter-attack in 1914 which led to victory during the First Battle of the Marne. In 1933 Gamelin rose to command the French Army and oversaw a modernisation and mechanisation programme, including the completion of the Maginot Line defences.

Édouard Daladier supported Gamelin throughout his career, owing to Gamelin's refusal to allow politics to play a part in military planning and promotion, and his commitment to the republican model of government; this was not a trivial matter at a time when Communists on the left and Royalists and Fascists on the right were openly advocating regime change in France.

Early years 
Maurice Gamelin was born in Paris on 20 September 1872. Gamelin's father, Zéphyrin, fought in the Battle of Solferino in 1859. From an early age Gamelin showed potential as a soldier, growing up in a generation seeking revenge on Germany for the annexation of Alsace-Lorraine at the end of the Franco-Prussian War.

Military career 
Gamelin volunteered for service on 19 October 1891 before entering the military academy at Saint-Cyr on 31 October. In 1893, he graduated first in his class.

He began in the French tirailleurs with the 3rd Regiment based in Tunisia. He then joined the topographic brigade. When Gamelin came back to Paris in 1897, he entered the prestigious École Supérieure de Guerre and finished second of his class of about eighty of the best future officers in the French Army. Charles Lanrezac, then second-in-command of the École Supérieure de Guerre, and later a general in the early days of World War I, noted Gamelin as an intelligent, cultivated, and industrious young officer, bound to earn higher functions in the future. Gamelin joined the staff of the 15th Army Corps before commanding a company of the 15th battalion of the Chasseurs Alpins in 1904. He received the applause of his superiors for his diligence at manœuvre.

He published Philosophical Study on the Art of War in 1906, which critics praised, predicting he would become an important military thinker in the near future. He then became an attaché to General Joseph Joffre (a future Marshal of France, as he led the French forces during World War I). This position had been obtained with the help of Ferdinand Foch (also a future Marshal of France, as he led the Allied Forces to victory on the Western Front in 1918). These positions provided Gamelin with a solid knowledge of strategic and tactical warfare.

In 1911, Gamelin was given command of the 11th battalion of the Chasseurs Alpins in Annecy. However, in March 1914 he joined Joffre's general staff (1914–18 called Grand Quartier Général). Early in the war, Gamelin helped draft the plans that led to the victory at the Battle of the Marne. He was promoted to lieutenant colonel and fought in Alsace on the Linge and later on the Somme. He became colonel in April 1916, and with good results on the battlefield was further promoted within eight months to the rank of brigadier general. He commanded the French 11th Infantry Division from April 1917 until the end of the war. In the region of Noyon, he showed sophisticated tactical skills by gaining ground without losing lives needlessly (which had been atypical earlier in the war, see Attaque à outrance).

From 1919 to 1924, Gamelin was the head of the French military mission in Brazil. He then commanded the French Army in the Levant, now Syria and Lebanon. He was the commander of the 30th Military Region in Nancy from 1919 to 1931, when he was named head of the general staff of the French Army. In 1932 he knew the Reichswehr mobilization plan was to at least treble their force, but lacked intelligence on the armament plan, the militia plan, or the Manstein Plan. He prepared France's military until the beginning of World War II, although challenged by restricted funding (→ Great Depression in France) and by the political inertia regarding German re-armament and later the Third Reich, which was intensified after the end of the Allied occupation of the Rhineland and its remilitarisation. At the outbreak of the war in September 1939, Gamelin was considered one of the best commanding generals in Europe, and was respected even among the Wehrmacht.

Role in the Second World War 
When war was declared in 1939, Gamelin was France's commander in chief, with his headquarters at the Château de Vincennes, a facility completely devoid of telephonic or any other electronic links to his commanders in the field: a massive oversight in the face of the Wehrmacht's subsequent swift and flexible ‘Blitzkrieg’ tactics. France saw little action during the Phoney War, apart from a few French divisions crossing the German border in the Saar Offensive, who advanced a mere . They stopped even before reaching Germany's unfinished Siegfried Line. According to General Siegfried Westphal, a German staff officer on the Western Front, if France had attacked in September 1939 German forces could not have held out for more than one or two weeks. Gamelin ordered his troops back behind the Maginot Line, but only after telling France's ally, Poland, that France had broken the Siegfried Line and that help was on its way . Before the war, he had expected the Polish Army to hold out against Germany for six months. Gamelin's long-term strategy was to wait until France had fully rearmed and for the British and French armies to build up their forces, even though this would mean waiting until 1941 . He prohibited any bombing of the industrial areas of the Ruhr, in case the Germans retaliated. The French mobilisation had called up many essential workers, which disrupted vital French industries in the first weeks of the campaign.

Gamelin's vision for France's defence was based upon a static defence along the Franco-German border, which was reinforced by the Maginot Line. However, the Line did not extend along the Belgian frontier. During the winter of 1939–40, which was one of the coldest of the 20th century, work on the extension of the Line along the Belgian frontier was slow and not of the same quality as the original defences. Gamelin, along with many other members of the French High Command, saw the Ardennes as impenetrable and chose to defend it with only ten reserve divisions and few fortifications. Much of the French army was posted further northwest along the Belgian frontier. According to General Hasso von Manteuffel, a German Panzer commander, France had more and better tanks than Germany, but chose to disperse them.

Gamelin's own views had changed from a purely defensive strategy relying on the Maginot Line. French strategists predicted a German drive across northern Belgium, as in 1914. Gamelin favoured an aggressive advance northward to meet the attacking German forces in Belgium and the Netherlands, as far removed from French territory as possible. This strategy, known as the Dyle Plan, fitted with Belgian defensive plans and also with British objectives. Gamelin committed much of the motorised forces of the French Army and the entire British Expeditionary Force (BEF) to this strategy. Such a strategy also meant that the most of the French Army would leave its one-year-old prepared defensive positions in northern France to be committed to joining battle on an unknown Belgian defensive line.

Despite reports of the build-up of German forces, and even knowing the date of the planned German attack, Gamelin did nothing until May 1940, stating that he would "await events". Then, when the Germans attacked, Gamelin insisted on moving 40 of his best divisions, including the BEF, northwards to conform to the Dyle Plan.

In the first few days of the Battle of Belgium, many Allied aircraft were attacked while still on the ground. The rest of the air support was concentrated on the French advance, rather than attacking the exposed  column supplying the German advance. Quickly, the French and the British became fearful of being outflanked and they withdrew from the defensive lines drawn up across Belgium. They did not pull back fast enough to prevent them being outflanked by the German Panzer divisions.

The German wing that attacked further south was able to cross the River Meuse faster than anticipated, aided by heavy Luftwaffe aerial bombardment. It was thus quickly captured and exploited by the Germans. Meanwhile, French guns were ordered to limit their firing in case they ran out of ammunition. German Colonel-General Heinz Guderian disregarded his orders, and attacked aggressively on this front. In response, Gamelin withdrew forces in this area so that they could defend Paris, thinking this was the Germans' objective, rather than the coast.

Believing that he had been betrayed rather than blaming his own strategy, Gamelin then sacked 20 of his front line commanders.

Further north, the German forces led by Major-General Erwin Rommel kept advancing quickly as well, also against orders. He reached the sea to the west of the British Expeditionary Force, trapping the forces that had been sent into the Low Countries around Arras and Dunkirk. In moving from France to Belgium and then back to France, a substantial amount of the Allied armour was lost due to mechanical failure. The French and British could no longer launch a counterattack spearheaded by tanks and thus break out of encirclement. The speed of this advance, German air supremacy, and the inability of the British and French to counter-attack undermined the overall Allied position to such a degree that Britain abandoned the conflict on the continent. 338,226 men (including 120,000 French soldiers) withdrew across the English Channel during the Dunkirk evacuation. A second British Expeditionary Force, due to land in Normandy in mid-June, was cancelled.

The Dutch surrendered within five days of being attacked, the Belgians in 18 days ("campagne des 18 jours"), and the French were left with only a rump of their former army to defend their nation. Gamelin was removed from his post on 18 May 1940 by Paul Reynaud, who had replaced Édouard Daladier as Prime Minister in March. The 68-year-old Gamelin was replaced by the 73-year-old Maxime Weygand, who crucially delayed planned counter-attacks before eventually launching them.

After the Fall of France 
Gamelin was both preceded and succeeded as Général d'armée by Maxime Weygand. The Vichy regime tried Gamelin for treason along with other important political and military figures of the Third Republic (Édouard Daladier, Guy La Chambre, Léon Blum, and Robert Jacomet) in the Riom Trial. Gamelin refused to answer the charges against him, instead maintaining silence, and the entire proceeding collapsed. Imprisoned by the Vichy regime in Fort du Portalet in the Pyrenees, he was later deported by the Germans to the Itter Castle in North Tyrol with a few other French high officials. He was freed from the castle after the Battle for Castle Itter. After the war, he published his memoirs, titled Servir (meaning "to serve").

Gamelin died in Paris in April 1958 at the age of 85.

References

Further reading 

 (Paperback ed. 2002 and 2003) 

L'Ouest-Eclair 1935-01-19 "Le général Gamelin succède au général Weygand comme généralissime tout en restant chef d'état-maior général". Includes a short bio.

External links 
Service records of General Gamelin

Generals of World War II

1872 births
1958 deaths
Military personnel from Paris
École Spéciale Militaire de Saint-Cyr alumni
French military personnel of World War I
French Army generals of World War II
French generals
Generalissimos
Burials at Passy Cemetery
People of the Great Syrian Revolt
19th-century French military personnel